Mars Cheese Castle is a specialty food store, delicatessen, and taproom which sells a variety of consumable products in Kenosha, Wisconsin. Located along Interstate 94, the shop is popular among Wisconsin visitors and has been called a "cheese landmark", "one of Wisconsin's most recognizable cheese stores", and "an icon for generations of I-94 travelers". While the store is best known for its cheese, it also sells sausages and other foods, beer, wine, specialty condiments, soft drinks and Wisconsin souvenirs such as cheesehead hats. 

The store is the oldest cheese shop located at what the Milwaukee Journal Sentinel called "Wisconsin's most visible cheese interchange"; the junction of Interstate 94 and Wisconsin Highway 142 had three cheese shops until 2009 when it was reduced to two.

The in-store deli offers burgers, bratwurst and other sandwiches.  A variety of draft and bottle beers are available in the taproom – including imported European beers and Wisconsin microbrews. There is also a bakery on site.

History
Mario Ventura, Sr., opened Mars Cheese Castle in 1947. The shop's name was inspired by its owner’s, as the name Mario comes from the Roman god Mars; the "Castle" part of the name was inspired by a castle in Italy owned by Ventura's mother. Kenosha artist George Pollard designed the store's logo; the project was Pollard's first job. The original store, which featured a large beer bottle on its roof, burned down in 1957; a new store was built nearby.

The new store, over twice as large as the previous building, was designed to more closely resemble an actual castle; it features a watchtower holding the store's wine and an entrance which resembles a drawbridge. A special statute passed by the Wisconsin Legislature allowed the store to keep its  sign at its new location despite a state law prohibiting signs that tall.

Mars Cheese Castle has attracted a number of celebrity visitors. Rock band Weezer held a record signing at the store in 2001, and Al Hirt, Al McGuire, John F. Kennedy, and Johnny Cash have all visited the store. U.S. Vice-President Joe Biden also stopped at the store while campaigning for the 2012 presidential election.

See also
Frank's Diner

References

External links
 

Buildings and structures in Kenosha, Wisconsin
Tourist attractions in Kenosha County, Wisconsin
Roadside attractions in Wisconsin